Goodfarm Township is one of seventeen townships in Grundy County, Illinois, USA.  As of the 2010 census, its population was 376 and it contained 141 housing units.

Geography

Cities, towns, villages
 Dwight (north quarter)

Cemeteries
The township contains Goodfarm Cemetery.

Major highways
  Interstate 55
  Illinois Route 47

Airports and landing strips
 Dwight Airport

Demographics

Political districts
 Illinois' 11th congressional district (from 2003 to 2013)
 State House District 75
 State Senate District 38

References
 
 United States Census Bureau 2007 TIGER/Line Shapefiles
 United States National Atlas

External links
 City-Data.com
 Illinois State Archives

Townships in Grundy County, Illinois
Townships in Illinois
1849 establishments in Illinois